Mohamed Basri widely known as Fqih Basri (1927 in Demnate, MoroccoOctober 14, 2003 in Chefchaouen, Morocco) was a lifelong political activist and Moroccan regime opponent.

Mohamed Basri was nicknamed 'Fqih Basri', since he had begun his studies at a Quranic school before entering, in 1944, Marrakech's Ben Yousef University, where he first joined the armed struggle against the French colonizers of Morocco.

In 1954, he was arrested by the authorities of the French Protectorate and imprisoned at Kenitra; the next year, he succeeded in escaping from the prison along with 37 other insurgents.

After independence, while commanding the National Liberation Army of the South, he helped found the UNFP, a socialist party that split from the Istiqlal party in 1959, and headed its daily newspaper, Al-Tahrir.

He was arrested and tortured for supposedly taking part in the so-called 'July 1960 Plot' against the monarchy, and again in 1963.

In 1966, he chose voluntary exile, not returning to Morocco until June, 1995. After his exile he was repeatedly implicated by the regime in various real and imagined plots against the monarchy, and repeatedly sentenced to death in absentia.

Victim of a heart attack, Basri died in Chefchaouen on October 14, 2003, soon after a Paris surgical operation. He was buried on 15 October.

References

1927 births
2003 deaths
Moroccan activists
Moroccan exiles
Moroccan dissidents
Moroccan socialists
National Union of Popular Forces politicians
People from Demnate
Members of the Moroccan Army of Liberation
Moroccan revolutionaries
Moroccan prisoners sentenced to death
Moroccan escapees
People sentenced to death in absentia
Moroccan democracy activists
Moroccan expatriates in Algeria
Republicanism in Morocco